Omar Anas (born 1933) is a Sudanese former sports shooter. He competed in three events at the 1960 Summer Olympics.

References

1933 births
Living people
Sudanese male sport shooters
Olympic shooters of Sudan
Shooters at the 1960 Summer Olympics
People from Omdurman